Mariusz Kukiełka (born 7 November 1976) is a Polish former professional footballer who played as a centre-back or as a midfielder. Kukiełka made 20 appearances for the Poland national team, scoring three goals.

International goals
Scores and results list Poland's goal tally first, score column indicates score after each Kukiełka goal.

References

External links
 
 
 
 Profile at FuPa.net

1976 births
Living people
People from Tarnobrzeg
Sportspeople from Podkarpackie Voivodeship
Polish footballers
Poland international footballers
Association football central defenders
Association football midfielders
Bundesliga players
2. Bundesliga players
Super League Greece players
Siarka Tarnobrzeg players
GKS Bełchatów players
Roda JC Kerkrade players
Amica Wronki players
PAOK FC players
1. FC Nürnberg players
Wisła Kraków players
Dynamo Dresden players
FC Energie Cottbus players
FC Viktoria Köln players
Xanthi F.C. players
Polish expatriate footballers
Polish expatriate sportspeople in the Netherlands
Expatriate footballers in the Netherlands
Polish expatriate sportspeople in Greece
Expatriate footballers in Greece
Polish expatriate sportspeople in Germany
Expatriate footballers in Germany